Perry is a city in Shiawassee County in the U.S. state of Michigan. The population was 2,188 at the 2010 census. The city is surrounded by Perry Township, but the two are administered autonomously.

History
A post office has been in operation in Perry since 1850. The city was named for Oliver Hazard Perry, an American naval commander in the War of 1812. Perry was incorporated in 1893.

Geography

Demographics

2010 census
As of the census of 2010, there were 2,188 people, 823 households, and 584 families living in the city. The racial makeup of the city was 96.8% White, 0.3% African American, 0.4% Native American, 0.3% Asian, 0.1% Pacific Islander, 0.5% from other races, and 1.6% from two or more races. Hispanic or Latino of any race were 1.7% of the population.

There were 823 households, of which 39.0% had children under the age of 18 living with them, 51.0% were married couples living together, 14.7% had a female householder with no husband present, 5.2% had a male householder with no wife present, and 29.0% were non-families. 23.6% of all households were made up of individuals, and 6.5% had someone living alone who was 65 years of age or older. The average household size was 2.66 and the average family size was 3.12.

The median age in the city was 34.1 years. 27.7% of residents were under the age of 18; 8.6% were between the ages of 18 and 24; 29.9% were from 25 to 44; 24.8% were from 45 to 64; and 9% were 65 years of age or older. The gender makeup of the city was 48.3% male and 51.7% female.

2000 census
As of the census of 2000, there were 2,065 people, 748 households, and 563 families living in the city. The racial makeup of the city was 97.82% White, 0.19% African American, 0.44% Native American, 0.39% Asian, 0.05% from other races, and 1.11% from two or more races. Hispanic or Latino of any race were 0.73% of the population.

There were 748 households, out of which 42.1% had children under the age of 18 living with them, 56.3% were married couples living together, 14.2% had a female householder with no husband present, and 24.7% were non-families. 21.7% of all households were made up of individuals, and 7.9% had someone living alone who was 65 years of age or older.  The average household size was 2.73 and the average family size was 3.16.

In the city, the population was spread out, with 30.7% under the age of 18, 7.5% from 18 to 24, 32.6% from 25 to 44, 21.0% from 45 to 64, and 8.3% who were 65 years of age or older.  The median age was 33 years. For every 100 females, there were 88.6 males.  For every 100 females age 18 and over, there were 86.9 males.

The median income for a household in the city was $45,179, and the median income for a family was $48,977. Males had a median income of $38,587 versus $26,250 for females. The per capita income for the city was $16,769.  About 3.4% of families and 5.7% of the population were below the poverty line, including 4.5% of those under age 18 and 18.5% of those age 65 or over.

Highways

Notable people
Alva M. Cummins (1869–1946), lawyer and 1922 Democratic nominee for Governor of Michigan

References

Cities in Shiawassee County, Michigan
Populated places established in 1893
1893 establishments in Michigan